Mehandi Laga Ke Rakhna 2 is a 2018 Indian Bhojpuri language romance drama film directed by Manjul Thakur and produced by Ananjay Raghuraj with co-produced by "Kumkum Films" under "Ananya Craft And Visions" and presented by "Aadi Shakti Entertainment" With "Trimurti Entertainment Media". This film is a remake of the 2006 Bollywood Film Humko Tumse Pyaar Hai. The film is a sequel of 2017 film Mehandi Laga Ke Rakhna. The stars Pradeep Pandey akka "Chintu" and Richa Dixit in lead role. While Yash Kumarr, Maya Yadav, Ranjish Jhanjhi, Upashna Vaishnav, Rajbeer Tiwari, Usha Vishwakarma, Dikeshwar Verma and Manoj Tiger appear in supporting roles. Anjana Singh and Poonam Dubey make a special appearance.

Producer Ananjay Raghuraj announced "Mehandi Laga Ke Rakhna 2" film would not be published on YouTube. He says "Me make film for theatre released not for YouTube".

Plot
Rahul and Raju became good friends when Raju's mother dies in a crash by his car. Rahul feels pity and brings Raju home and lets him live in his home. Their friendship grew with time. Rahul's parents dislike Raju, but he respects them. When Rahul leaves for the city, Raju helps an old lady to sell her belongings and she invites him to learn art. He wants to win her heart, so after a small accidental fire in which he saves her, she insults him and tells her to leave the palace. When Pooja's little brother tells her the truth, she starts loving him. Pooja's mother knows about this and asks him to leave Pooja. Instead he assures that he will help to get Pooja's eyes back. At the hospital doctor refuses to operate because they can't pay him. The eye doctor's daughter is involved in an accident and need A− blood, which none of the  blood banks had  available. Raju listens to the conversation and offers to help the doctor. Raju is involved in an accident and Rahul was marrying Pooja. Rahul finds Ranu and gets him home, but Raju is now blind.

In the final scene Pooja learns the truth and Raju escapes. Rahul learns the truth and stops the marriage, Rahul searches for Raju. When  Rahul finds him, Raju tries to run away, so Rahul chases him and the accident occurs. To save Raju, Rahul runs behind him and saves him, but this costs Rahul his life. He asks the doctor to donate his eyes to Raju so he can see.

Cast

 Pradeep Pandey "Chintu" as Rajesh
 Yash Kumar Mishra as Rahul
 Richa Dixit as Pooja
 Maya Yadav as  Pooja's mother
Manoj Tiger as Doctor
Ranjish Jhanjhi as Rahul's father
Upashna Vaishnav
Usha Vishwakarma
Dikeshwar Verma
 Anjana Singh as special appearance
 Poonam Dubey as special appearance

Production
Filming was this film was done in Amdi village in Dhamtari district of Chhattisgarh with some scenes shot in Patna and Motihari.

The cinematography has been done by Sidharth Singh while choreography is by Kanu Mukharjee and Ram Devan. it was edited by Santosh Harwade and its action director is Andlib Pathan. Dress designed by Badshah Khan. Background music scored by Aslam Surty while sound designed by Rajeev Kumar. Post-production done by Eye Focus Studio.

Release
"Mehandi Laga Ke Rakhna 2" was theatrically released on 27 April 2018 in all over India.

Soundtrack

The music for "Mehandi Laga Ke Rakhna 2" was composed by Rajnish Mishra and Madhukar Anand with lyric penned by Pyare Lal Yadav, Azad Singh, Shyam Dehati and Rajesh Mishra. The soundtrack included an unusually large number of songs at 10. It was produced under the "Enter 10 Music" label.

Her song "Barsati Rahe Teri Rahmat Sada" released on 30 May 2018 at YouTube and he create history with 95 millions views. Another song "Gulari Ke Phulwa Balam" released on 13 June 2018 and he got 23 millions views.

Marketing
Trailer of this film was released on 7 April 2018 at YouTube official handle of "Enter10 Music Bhojpuri" and he got over 14 millions views on YouTube.

References

Indian romantic drama films
Bhojpuri remakes of Hindi films
Indian sequel films
2010s Bhojpuri-language films
2018 romantic drama films